Juan Carlos Guerra Zunzunegui (1 February 1935 – 28 September 2020) was a Spanish lawyer and politician who served as a Senator and Deputy.

References

1935 births
2020 deaths
Spanish politicians